The Palace of the Count of Buenavista is a Mexican historical building located in Cuauhtémoc (one of the 16 boroughs of Mexico City), precisely at 50 Puente de Alvarado Street, in the Tabacalera neighborhood. It was built between the end of the 18th century and the beginning of the 19th century to serve as the future residence of the Count of Buenavista, who however never lived there. Since 1968 it houses the National Museum of San Carlos. It was declared a historical monument on March 28, 1932.

References 

Neoclassical architecture in Mexico
Palaces in Mexico
Landmarks in Mexico City
Buildings and structures in Mexico City